"You Are a Danger" is the debut single by Italo disco singer Gary Low, released in 1982. It was a hit in several countries across Europe, with its biggest success in Spain, where it reached number one.

The song did not initially appear on Low's 1983 debut album Go On, but was included the following year on the Spanish release Grandes Éxitos on the Hispavox label.

Charts

References

1982 songs
1982 debut singles
Gary Low songs
Number-one singles in Spain
Carrere Records singles
Songs with music by Pierluigi Giombini